Fear the Force is the fourth EP released by the melodic hard rock band Ten. The compact disc was officially released only in Japan.

Track listing
All songs written by Gary Hughes except where noted.
 "Fear the Force" – 5:37
 "Xanadu" – 4:55 (Hughes/Vinny Burns)
 "Rainbow In the Dark" – 4:51
 "We Rule the Night" (Acoustic version) – 5:18
 "Red" (Acoustic version) – 4:15
 "Till the End of Time" (Acoustic version) – 3:47

Track 1 from the album Spellbound.
Tracks 2-6 were previously unreleased.

Personnel
Gary Hughes – vocals
Vinny Burns – Lead guitars
John Halliwell – Rhythm guitars
Ged Rylands – keyboards
Steve McKenna – bass guitar
Greg Morgan – drums

Production
Mixing – Rafe McKenna (Track 1)
Mixing – Audu Obaje (Tracks 2, 4-6)

References

External links
 https://web.archive.org/web/20010430233542/http://www.usiwakamaru.or.jp/~oct-23/page/tencd.html

Ten (band) albums
1999 EPs